Babín is a village and municipality in Námestovo District in the Žilina Region of northern Slovakia.

History
In historical records the village was first mentioned in 1267.

Geography
The municipality lies at an altitude of 428 metres and covers an area of 2.151 km². It has a population of about 290 people.

Genealogical resources

The records for genealogical research are available at the state archive "Statny Archiv in Bytca, Slovakia"

 Roman Catholic church records (births/marriages/deaths): 1788-1840, 1871-1922
 Census records 1869 of Babin are not available at the state archive.

See also
 List of municipalities and towns in Slovakia

External links
https://www.webcitation.org/5QjNYnAux?url=http://www.statistics.sk/mosmis/eng/run.html
Surnames of living people in Babin

Villages and municipalities in Námestovo District